Robert Boyle is a game designer who has worked primarily on role-playing games.

Career
Rob Boyle had been an editor at FASA during its waning days, and decided not to go over to WizKids when the new company was forming, as he knew that they would not be working on FASA's roleplaying lines. Boyle considered making a bid to license Shadowrun, but before he could, Fantasy Productions expressed interest in Shadowrun themselves. Fantasy Productions founder Werner Fuchs invited Boyle to visit him in Germany, and Boyle was soon setting up and running FanPro LLC, a new corporation created by two of the principals of the Fantasy Productions and Boyle himself. They created the new USA subsidiary FanPro LLC to hold the rights to FASA's game lines. FanPro licensed Shadowrun in early 2001, and Boyle took over as Line Editor. FanPro got Shadowrun going again almost immediately, and Boyle's biggest concern was continuing the metaplot. Boyle also tried out something new: the downloadable "Shadowrun Missions", which were overseen by Rich Osterhout in their first season. Boyle started working on a few edition of Shadowrun around 2003, having decided that the game needed simplification, which was published as Shadowrun, Fourth Edition (2005).

In 2007, Boyle and Randall N. Bills tried to buy FanPro LLC from Fantasy Productions and when that did not work out they threatened to leave and implied that they would be bidding for the WizKids licenses, which were just coming up for renewal. WizKids stepped in to mediate; although they were not willing to let Boyle and Bills create a new company, they were willing to give the licenses to InMediaRes. After acquiring the rights to Shadowrun and Battletech, InMediaRes took on Boyle and Bills as regular staff – which had been part of the agreement with WizKids; Boyle remained as the Shadowrun Line Editor for the next few years, while Bills became a Managing Director of InMediaRes. Catalyst Game Labs's fourth roleplaying line was Eclipse Phase (2009), the product of Posthuman Studios, a new game design studio created by Boyle, Shadowrun writer Brian Cross, and graphic designer Adam Jury. Boyle had been thinking about the idea for his game studio since he had come over from FanPro, and following the publication of Eclipse Phase, Boyle would step away from his role as Shadowrun developer. Boyle was not able to put any supplements out for Eclipse Phase before problems at Catalyst eventually caused him to part ways with the company.

References

External links
 Home page
 Robert Boyle :: Pen & Paper RPG Database archive

Living people
Role-playing game designers
Year of birth missing (living people)